Vijay Patil (16 September 1942 – 22 May 2021) better known as Raamlaxman, was an Indian composer, pianist, musician and accordionist. Raamlaxman is most famous for his work with Rajshri Productions of Hindi films. He composed music for their hit films like Maine Pyar Kiya (1989), Hum Aapke Hain Koun..! (1994), Hum Saath Saath Hain (1999), Muskurahat (1992), Police Public (1990), 100 Days (1991). His first film was Agent Vinod (1977) Raamlaxman has worked in almost 75 films in Hindi, Marathi and Bhojpuri.

Raamlaxman is the "Laxman" of duo composers "Raam-Laxman". In 1976, "Raam" (his partner Surendra) died immediately after signing the film Agent Vinod (1977). Laxman continued to retain Raam's name in Marathi as well as Hindi films. He died of heart attack on 22 May 2021, at the age of 78.

Early life
Raamlaxman started his own orchestra named as Amar - Vijay (Amar was his son's name). The famous comedian, Dada Kondke was impressed by him and approached him to compose the music for his Marathi comedy Pandu Hawaldar. Vijay, with his friend Raam, composed the music that went on to become a raging hit, and their alliance with Kondke did not break until the latter's death. Later, he did films with Manmohan Desai, Mahesh Bhatt, G.P.Sippy, Anil Ganguly and others. His favourite singers were Shailendra Singh and Usha Mangeshkar, while his favourite lyricist was Asad Bhopali. His releases were mostly with Ravindra Rawal. Although he frequently collaborated with Lata Mangeshkar and produced some of the biggest hits in his career.

In 1981, Raamlaxman collaborated with Ravindra Rawal for movie Hum Se Badhkar Kaun. Song "Deva O Deva Ganpati Deva" got famous during that period. He has also given music for movies Hum Se Hai Zamana (1983), Woh Jo Hasina (1983), Deewana Tere Naam Ka (1987) and Aage Ki Soch (1988).

Career
In the year 1988, Raamlaxman got a major break with Sooraj Barjatya's Maine Pyar Kiya (1989). His composition earned him filmfare award for Best Music Director. The film set the record at its time for the most Filmfare awards won by a single film with seven, from thirteen nominations. It was also the first film to win the three major awards in music category (Best Music Director, Male Playback Singer, Best Lyricist). The film also launched S. P. Balasubrahmanyam as voice of new actor Salman Khan from period 1989 to 1994.

Laxman scored a major hit once again with superhit film Hum Aapke Hain Koun..! (1994). His collaboration with Sooraj Barjatya went on and he gave good hits in the film Hum Saath Saath Hain (1999).

Discography

See also
List of Bollywood films

References

External links

Indian film score composers
Filmfare Awards winners
Marathi people
2021 deaths
1942 births
20th-century Indian composers
20th-century male musicians
21st-century Indian composers
21st-century male musicians